Marae is a bilingual Māori and English language current affairs show on TVNZ 1, presented by Scotty Morrison and Miriama Kamo.

It is the longest Māori running current affairs programme on New Zealand television, starting in 1992. The items are in English and Māori language, this percentage changes over time. The focus of the programme is, "issues .... that affect the lives of Māori, or explaining kaupapa Māori from a Māori perspective."

Staff 
People who have worked on Marae over the years include producers Victor Allen (Assoc. Producer) and Derek Wooster (Producer 1992 - 2009).

Tainui Stephens was a director, producer, executive producer, presenter and reporter in the early days from 1992 until 1997.

Reporters have included Te Rangihau Gilbert, Greg Mayor, Carmen Parahi (2010 - 2014), Kayne Peters (2013 - 2015), Tahuri Tumoana, Mātai Smith (and presenter, 1996 - 1998). Directors have included Dean Hapeta, Rongotai Lomas, Greg Mayor, Tahuri Tumoana, Nevak Rogers (2002), Derek Wooster (Studio Director 1992 - 2008).

See also
Te Karere
List of New Zealand television series

References

External links

1990s New Zealand television series
2000s New Zealand television series
2010s New Zealand television series
2020s New Zealand television series
1992 New Zealand television series debuts
Current affairs shows
Māori culture
New Zealand television news shows
TVNZ 1 original programming
Television shows funded by NZ on Air
Television news program articles using incorrect naming style